Dactyloscopus fimbriatus is a species of sand stargazer native to the Pacific coastal waters of Central and South America from Nicaragua to Ecuador where it can be found at depths of from .  It can reach a maximum length of  SL.

References

External links
 Photograph

fimbriatus
Fish described in 1935
Taxa named by Earl Desmond Reid